The Philadelphia and Lancaster Turnpike, first used in 1795, is the first long-distance paved road built in the United States, according to engineered plans and specifications. It links Lancaster, Pennsylvania, and Philadelphia at 34th Street, stretching for sixty-two miles. It was later extended by the Lancaster and Susquehanna Turnpike to the Susquehanna River in Columbia.  The route is designated Pennsylvania Route 462 from the western terminus to US 30, where that route takes over for the majority of the route.  The US 30 designation ends at Girard Avenue in the Parkside neighborhood of Philadelphia, where State Route 3012 takes it from there to Belmont Avenue.  At Belmont Avenue, State Route 3005 gets the designation from Belmont Avenue until the current terminus at 34th Street.  Historically, Lancaster Pike terminated at Market Street before Drexel University took over the stretch between 32nd and 34th Streets.

It was the first turnpike of importance, and because the Commonwealth of Pennsylvania could not afford to pay for its construction, it was privately built by the Philadelphia and Lancaster Turnpike Road Company, making it an early example of a public-private partnership for American infrastructure.  Credited as the country's first engineered road, its ground was broken in 1792.  By the 1840s, the use of railroads and canals dealt a serious blow to the companies who specialized in the manufacture of wagons and coaches. During the next fifty years, the road suffered from lack of use and maintenance, but later saw recovery with the invention of the automobile.

In 1876, the parallel Pennsylvania Railroad bought the turnpike from 52nd Street in Philadelphia west to Paoli for $20,000 (equal to $ today) to prevent competing streetcar companies from building along it. In 1913, the turnpike became part of the transcontinental Lincoln Highway, and tolls continued to be collected until 1917, when the State Highway Department bought it for $165,000, equal to $ today. In 1926 it was designated as part of U.S. Route 30 along with the rest of the original United States Numbered Highways.

Major intersections

See also

Great Wagon Road
Lincoln Highway
"The Colossus", 1813 bridge

References

External links

 Pennsylvania Highways: US 30
 Lancaster Avenue: Turn of the Millennium. Photographs along the Lancaster Turnpike in Philadelphia.

Lincoln Highway
Pre-freeway turnpikes in the United States
History of Lancaster, Pennsylvania
Streets in Philadelphia
U.S. Route 30
1795 establishments in Pennsylvania
Historic trails and roads in Pennsylvania
Transportation in Lancaster, Pennsylvania
Transportation in Montgomery County, Pennsylvania
Transportation in Lancaster County, Pennsylvania
Transportation in Chester County, Pennsylvania
Transportation in Delaware County, Pennsylvania